Stacy Eleanor Wilson (born May 12, 1965) is a former captain of the Canadian national women's hockey team, former assistant coach, author and the former head coach of the Bowdoin College women's ice hockey team.

Early life 
She was born in Moncton, New Brunswick on May 12, 1965 to Trueman Townsend Wilson and Elizabeth Ann Wilson (née Beckwith). Wilson grew up in the nearby village of Salisbury and attended JMA Armstrong High School. She graduated from Acadia University in 1987, with a bachelor's degree in physical education.

Playing career 
Stacy Wilson began her career by playing minor hockey with boys until reaching the bantam level. After her last year of bantam, Wilson stopped playing hockey. Wilson would pursue badminton and excel in the sport at the provincial and Maritime level.

Acadia University
By her second year at Acadia University, Wilson began playing hockey again. Along with other female hockey players, Wilson helped to create a women's hockey team at the university. There was no varsity hockey team at the university so the team was a club team. The team wore used Acadia varsity men's hockey sweaters, and raised funds to play in a few tournaments. Wilson and her teammates were part of two Nova Scotia provincial championships. In addition, the Acadia club team represented Nova Scotia at the Women's National Championship in 1986 and 1987.

New Brunswick
Wilson graduated from Acadia University in 1987. She began to play senior women's hockey with the Moncton Blades (later known as the Maritime Blades). From 1986-87 to 1992-93, she was on Team New Brunswick at the National Women's Championships and was the leading scorer at the National Championships in 1986. She was named to the All-Star team in 1988 and was the most sportsmanlike player in 1990 and 1996. She earned MVP and leading scorer titles in 1990 in the New Brunswick Senior Women's Hockey League. Wilson also represented Team New Brunswick at the 1998 Esso Nationals. She scored two goals to defeat Team Saskatchewan and finish in fifth place.

Team Canada
At the 1990 World Championships in Ottawa, Ontario, she led her team to a gold medal, scoring three goals and eight assists in five games. She was on the gold medal team at the 1992 World Championships in Tampere, Finland, but she was injured, scoring one goal and one assist in five games. She was also a member of the gold medal winning team at the 1994 World Championships in Lake Placid, New York, scoring four goals and four assists in five games. Wilson also played on the second place Maritime Sports Blades at the 1995 National Championships, scoring six goals and six assists in six games en route to earning the most valuable player award.

Wilson was on the gold medal winning teams at the 1995 and 1996 Pacific Rim championships in Richmond, British Columbia, and in San Jose, California. 
 
She was the captain of the gold medal winning team at the 1997 Ice Hockey World Championships in Kitchener, Ontario, where she scored one goal and four assists in five games. At the 1997 National Championships, Stacy Wilson received a medal as a game MVP. She proceeded to get the medal cut into 20 pieces and shared the pieces with her teammates.
 
She won the silver medal in the 1998 Winter Olympics in Nagano as the captain of the Canadian team. Her five assists in ice hockey at the 1998 Winter Olympics ranked second on the Canadian team behind Hayley Wickenheiser.

Retirement
She retired shortly after the Olympics due to injuries.

Coaching career
She was assistant coach of the Minnesota–Duluth Bulldogs women's ice hockey program from May 1999 to June 2004. During her tenure, the Bulldogs won three NCAA Championships.

She was hired in May 2007, as the head coach of the Bowdoin College women's ice hockey program. She resigned as head coach on April 19, 2010, as a result of her decision to move back to New Brunswick. 
Wilson was inducted into the Acadia University Hockey Hall of Fame in 1998, the only woman ever to be so honoured.

Post-hockey career
In 2000, she wrote a book entitled The Hockey Book for Girls, which was nominated for a Red Cedar Book Award. A review of the book published by CM: Canadian Review of Materials gives it four stars out of five and notes: "Without bashing male hockey, this book provides support to girls who are trying to break into a field that has been male dominated". However, a review in the School Library Journal stated that "[w]hile young athletes will glean a few pointers from this slim book, the information provided is somewhat limited...Unfortunately, the book is poorly written and some of the full-color photographs are small while others are unfocused".

In 2004, she received her Master of Education (M.Ed.) from University of Minnesota Duluth.

Wilson was inducted into the New Brunswick Sports Hall of Fame in 2007 

Wilson is also a volunteer with the New Brunswick women's hockey council.

Personal life
She has one brother, Shane Allison Wilson and one sister, Shelley Anne Wilson.

Statistics

International

Awards and honours
Acadia Sports Hall of Fame member
New Brunswick Sports Hall of Fame member
In 2003, the Bulldogs coaching staff that Wilson was a part of was named the American Association of College Coaches' women's hockey coaching staff of the year.

References

External links
Stacy Wilson biography and stats
Stacy Wilson Bowdoin page
Hockey Canada - 1999 Booklet

1965 births
Living people
Canadian women's ice hockey forwards
Sportspeople from Moncton
Ice hockey players at the 1998 Winter Olympics
Medalists at the 1998 Winter Olympics
Olympic ice hockey players of Canada
Olympic medalists in ice hockey
Olympic silver medalists for Canada
Ice hockey people from New Brunswick
New Brunswick Sports Hall of Fame inductees